The African territories of Ruanda and Urundi came under Belgian control as Ruanda-Urundi after they were seized from Germany during World War I in 1916. They had previously formed part of German East Africa. 
 

The territory was under Belgian military occupation from 1916 to 1922, and stamps of Belgian Congo were overprinted for the occupied territories with bilingual inscriptions "EST AFRICAIN ALLEMAND OCCUPATION BELGE / DUITSCH OOST AFRIKA BELGISCHE BEZETTING" in French and Dutch.

Ruanda-Urundi later became a Belgian-controlled Class B Mandate under the League of Nations from 1922 to 1945. Stamps of Belgian Congo overprinted "Ruanda-Urundi" were issued in 1924. The first series of definitive stamps featuring local themes was issued in 1931.   

The territory became a Trust Territory of the United Nations in 1946. Ruanda-Urundi gained independence in 1962 as two separate countries of Rwanda and Burundi.

See also
 Postage stamps and postal history of German East Africa
 Postage stamps and postal history of Rwanda
 Postage stamps and postal history of Burundi

References

External links

Cancellations of Ruanda-Urundi

Philately of Belgium
Philately of Burundi
Ruanda-Urundi
Philately of Rwanda